Anantnag railway station is a railway station on the Northern railway network. It is the headquarters of Anantnag division of Northern Railway zone. It lies in Firozpur division.

History

The station has been built as part of the Jammu–Baramulla line megaproject, intending to link the Kashmir Valley with Jammu Tawi and the rest of the Indian rail network.

The station is basically located in rice fields which are between wanpoh and harnag. It is approximately 4.5 km far from Anantnag town.

Design
The station features Kashmiri wood architecture, with an intended ambience of a royal court which is designed to complement the local surroundings to the station. Station signage is predominantly in Urdu, English and Hindi.

See also
Srinagar railway station
Bijbehara railway station
Jammu–Baramulla line
Srinagar Airport
Pahalgam
Aharbal
Martand Sun Temple
Kulgam
Qazigund
Amarnath temple
Verinag

References

Railway stations in Anantnag district
Firozpur railway division
Railway stations opened in 2008